Timothy Lee Aymar (September 4, 1963 – February 13, 2023) was an American heavy metal singer. He was best known as the vocalist of progressive metal band Pharaoh and for his work with Chuck Schuldiner in Control Denied. His rise to fame began with his band, Triple-X.

Career 
Aymar had been a vocalist since 1985 with the band 313, then he joined Triple X and released an album with them. He joined Psycho Scream, where his bandmate Jim Dofka introduced him to the music of Chuck Schuldiner and his band Death. Schuldiner heard Aymar's voice on Psycho Scream and contacted him through his bandmate Jim Dofka. After a three-song audition, he joined Schuldiner's new band Control Denied as the vocalist and was known for his strong vocals in that band.

Death 
Aymar died from a heart attack on February 13, 2023 at the age of 59.

Awards 
Aymar's band Triple-X won the In Pittsburgh Music Awards for Best Metal Band in 1990, and was the first regional band to be awarded a national sponsorship, which was from Anheuser-Busch/Budweiser Anheuser-Busch.

Discography

With 313 
313 Album 'Three Thirteen' released on CD by Divebomb Records in early 2019.
This was released on vinyl in 2020.

Sources: 

https://www.discogs.com/release/15814946-313-Three-Thirteen
https://tribunalrecords.bandcamp.com/album/three-thirteen

With Triple X 
Bang (full-length, 1991)

With Control Denied 
The Fragile Art of Existence (full-length, 1999)

With Psycho Scream 
Spring '94 Limited Edition (demo, 1994)
Virtual Insanity (full-length 1994)
Demo 1996 (demo, 1996)

With Pharaoh 
After the Fire (2003)
The Longest Night (2005)
Be Gone (2008)
Ten Years (EP) (2011)
Bury the Light (2012)
The Powers That Be (2021)

With Vicious Cycle 
Burrn (demo, 2002)

With Advent of Bedlam 
Flesh Over God (full-length, 2012)

With Xthirt13n 
A Taste of the Light (full-length, 2014)

With Art X 
The Redemption of Cain (guest vocals, 2016)

With Angband 
 IV (full-length, 2020)

References

External links 
 Facebook Profile
 Pharaoh Website
 Death and Control Denied Website
 

1963 births
2023 deaths
American male singers
American heavy metal singers
Control Denied members
Musicians from Pittsburgh